Amanda Woodward is Dean of the Division of the Social Sciences and the William S. Gray Professor of Psychology at the University of Chicago. Her research investigates infant social cognition and early language development including the understanding of goal-directed actions, agency, theory of mind, and learning from social partners. She is a fellow of the American Academy of Arts and Sciences.

Career
Amanda Woodward was named Dean of the Division of the Social Sciences in April 2018. Prior to that, she served as Deputy Dean for Faculty Affairs in the Division from 2015 to 2017 and as Chair of the Department of Psychology from 2013 to 2015. She was named the William S. Gray Distinguished Service Professor of Psychology in December 2016. She joined the University of Chicago faculty in 1993, spent five years at the University of Maryland, and returned to the University of Chicago in 2010.

Research
Woodward has pioneered the development of experimental methods to investigate social cognition in infants and young children. Her research has yielded fundamental insights into infants’ social understanding and the processes that support conceptual development early in life. Her current work investigates infants’ sensitivity to interpersonal social structure, the effects of cultural and community contexts in shaping children's social learning strategies, and the neural processes involved in early social-cognitive development. She was a founding member of the Center for Early Childhood Research and currently directs the Infant Learning and Development Laboratory and chairs the Developmental Program.

Woodward's research has been recognized by a number of awards, including the Ann L. Brown Award for Excellence in Developmental Research, the APA Boyd McCandless Award for an Early Career Contribution to Developmental Psychology, and the John Merck Scholars Award. She is a fellow of the American Academy of Arts and Sciences, the Association for Psychological Science, and the American Psychological Association.

Education
Woodward completed her undergraduate degree at Swarthmore College in 1987 and her doctoral degree at Stanford University in 1992.

References

External links 
Office of the President | University of Chicago
Amanda Woodward Lab | University of Chicago
Amanda Woodward named Dean of the Division of the Social Sciences, University of Chicago

American women psychologists
21st-century American psychologists
Stanford University alumni
Cornell University fellows
University of Chicago faculty
Year of birth missing (living people)
Living people
American women academics
21st-century American women